The following is a timeline of the history of the city of Saint-Louis, Senegal.

Prior to 20th century

 1758 - May: British forces take French fort.
 1763 - Catholic Apostolic Prefecture of Sénégal established.
 1783 - French in power in region per Treaty of Paris (1783).
 1809 - British in power in region.
 1814 - French in power in region per Treaty of Paris (1814).
 1817 - French school founded by Jean Dard.
 1819 - Catholic Sisters of St. Joseph of Cluny, France arrive in Saint-Louis.
 1822 - Court of First Instance and Appeals Court established.
 1828 - St. Louis Cathedral consecrated.
 1847 -  built.
 1848 - French citizenship nominally granted to residents of Saint-Louis.
 1849 - Public library established.
 1852 - Branch of French trading firm Maurel & Prom in business.
 1853 - Guet N'Dar bridge built to Isle de Sor (approximate date).
 1856
  colonial government newspaper begins publication.
  (school) active.
 1858 - Walo becomes part of Saint-Louis.
 1865 - Faidherbe Bridge opens.
 1872 - Municipal government established.
 1881 - Yellow fever outbreak.
 1885
 Dakar–Saint-Louis railway built.
  begins operating.
  newspaper begins publication.
 1895 - Saint-Louis becomes capital of French West Africa.
 1897 - Faidherbe Bridge rebuilt.

20th century
 1903 
 Capital of French West Africa moved from Saint-Louis to Dakar.
 École normale (school) established.
 1904 - Population: 24,070.
 1905 - Bamako-Saint-Louis railway begins operating.
 1916
 French citizenship fully extended to residents of Saint-Louis.
  (school) founded.
 1919 - Lycée Faidherbe (school) established.
 1923 -  (school) opens.
 1956 -  (museum) opens.
 1957 - Capital of French Colonial Mauritania moved from Saint-Louis to Nouakchott.
 1960 - Saint Louis becomes part of independent Republic of Senegal.
 1965 -  founded.
 1969 - ASC Linguère (football club) formed.
 1990 - University of Saint-Louis established.
 1993 -  active.
 1994 - Population: 132,449 (estimate).
 1999 - Population: 147,961.
 2000 - Island of Saint-Louis designated an Unesco World Heritage Site.

21st century
 2009 - Cheikh Bamba Dièye elected mayor.
 2011 - Population: 277,245.
 2014 - Mansour Faye elected mayor.

See also
 Saint-Louis history
 List of mayors of Saint-Louis, Senegal
 List of colonial governors of Senegal, 1626-1960, intermittently headquartered in Saint-Louis
 
 
 Timeline of Dakar

References

This article incorporates information from the French Wikipedia.

Bibliography

in English
 
 
 
 
  
 
  (About Saint Louis)

in French

External links

  (Bibliography)
  
 Items related to Saint-Louis, Senegal, various dates (via Europeana)
 Items related to Saint-Louis, Senegal, various dates (via Digital Public Library of America)

Images

Saint-Louis, Senegal
Saint-Louis
History of Senegal
Years in Senegal
Senegal history-related lists